The Whistlers is a 2019  Romanian crime thriller film directed by Corneliu Porumboiu and starring Vlad Ivanov. It premiered in competition at the 2019 Cannes Film Festival. It was selected as the Romanian entry for the Best International Feature Film at the 92nd Academy Awards, but it was not nominated.

Plot
Zsolt, a corrupt businessman in Bucharest in league with Spanish gangsters, has been smuggling drug money out of the country in mattresses. Among those on his payroll are his mistress, the glamorous Gilda, and Cristi, a police inspector whose payoffs are left in his mother's cellar. When Zsolt is arrested, the Spaniards concoct a plot to free both him and the latest mattressfuls of cash. Cristi will be seduced by Gilda and taken to the Spanish island of La Gomera to learn El Silbo, the native whistling language. Back in Bucharest, he will then poison Zsolt, who will be rushed to hospital under guard. Once Cristi has ascertained the room number, he will whistle it to Gilda outside and the Spaniards will then rescue Zsolt. Many things go wrong and most characters get killed while Cristi, badly injured, ends up in hospital. Gilda finds out the room number and whistles to him to join her at a hotel in Singapore.

(The eight chapters of the film are not chronological, and the real-time sequence is: 1. Zsolt 2. Mama 3. Gilda 4. Kiko 5. Sylbo language 6. Paco 7. Magda 8. Cristi.)

Cast
 Vlad Ivanov as Cristi
  as Gilda
 Agustí Villaronga as Paco
 Cristóbal Pinto as Carlito
 Sergiu Costache as Toma
 Antonio Buíl as Kiko

Production
The film was produced through the director's company 42 km Film in collaboration with France's Les Films du Worso and Germany's Komplizen Film, with mk2 handling the distribution sales. Shooting took place in Romania and the Canary Islands.

Release
The film competed for the Palme d'Or at the 2019 Cannes Film Festival. In May 2019, the film's UK distribution rights were sold to Curzon Artificial Eye, and the US rights sold to Magnolia Pictures.

Reception 
The site's critical consensus reads, "The Whistlers finds writer-director Corneliu Porumboiu working in a more crowd-pleasing vein than previous efforts, with thoroughly entertaining results." Metacritic, which uses a weighted average, assigned the film a score of 77 out of 100, based on 27 critics, indicating "generally favorable reviews". Reporting from the Cannes Film Festival, Jessica Kiang of Variety wrote that the film "is an enjoyable affair with just enough of a slant to feel a little offbeat", but might leave fans of Porumboiu's previous films disappointed. New York Times's A.O. Scott wrote that while the film is "an ingeniously structured, engaging and witty display of filmmaking skill," it "is Porumboiu’s most elaborate feature and in some ways his least ambitious".

Accolades

See also
 List of submissions to the 92nd Academy Awards for Best International Feature Film
 List of Romanian submissions for the Academy Award for Best International Feature Film

References

External links

2019 films
Films directed by Corneliu Porumboiu
Films shot in Bucharest
Films shot in Romania
Films shot in the Canary Islands
Films shot in Spain
2010s Romanian-language films
English-language Romanian films
English-language French films
English-language German films
2010s Spanish-language films
French crime thriller films
German crime thriller films
Films set in the Canary Islands
Romanian crime thriller films
2010s English-language films
2019 multilingual films
Romanian multilingual films
French multilingual films
German multilingual films
2010s French films
2010s German films